Thatichetlapalem is a suburb in Visakhapatnam, India. It is located close to other bigger suburbs such as Akkayyapalem and Kancharapalem.

References

Neighbourhoods in Visakhapatnam